Robert Fowler (13 July 1840 – 12 June 1906) was an Australian politician.

He was born in Sydney to pottery manufacturer Enoch Fowler and Jane Lucas. After attending Christ Church School, he worked in his father's pottery business, becoming a partner when his father died in 1879. On 2 October 1867 he married Jane Seale, with whom he had eight children. Closely involved in local government, he served on Cook Municipal Council (1869–70, mayor 1870), Camperdown Municipal Council (1870–71, mayor 1870–71) and Sydney City Council (1872–87, 1890–1901, mayor 1880). In 1894 he was elected to the New South Wales Legislative Assembly as the Free Trade member for Sydney-Phillip. Defeated in 1895, he was appointed to the New South Wales Legislative Council, where he served until his death at Camperdown in 1906.

References

 

1840 births
1906 deaths
Members of the New South Wales Legislative Assembly
Members of the New South Wales Legislative Council
Free Trade Party politicians
Mayors and Lord Mayors of Sydney
19th-century Australian politicians